Teopisca is a town and one of the 119 Municipalities of Chiapas, in southern Mexico.

As of 2010, the municipality had a total population of 37,607, up from 26,996 as of 2005. It covers an area of 174 km².  

As of 2010, the town of Teopisca had a population of 16,240. Other than the town of Teopisca, the municipality had 123 localities, the largest of which (with 2010 populations in parentheses) were Nuevo León (2,782) and Betania (2,274).

References

Municipalities of Chiapas